In physics, an energy well describes a 'stable' equilibrium that is not at lowest possible energy.

In general, modern physics holds the view that the universe - and systems therein -  spontaneously drives toward a state of lower energy, if possible.  For example, a bowling ball pitched atop a smooth hump (which has potential energy in the presence of gravity), will tend to roll down to the lowest point it possibly can.  Once there, this reduces the total potential energy of the system.

On the other hand, if the bowling ball is resting in a valley between two humps - no matter how big the drops outside the humps - it will stay there indefinitely.  Even though the system could achieve a lower energy state, it cannot do so without external energy being applied: (locally) it is at its lowest energy state, and only a force from outside the system can 'push' it over one of the humps so a lower state can be achieved.

The concept of an energy well is a key part of teaching basic physics, especially quantum mechanics.  Here, students often solve the one-dimensional Schrödinger Equation for an electron trapped in a potential well from which it has insufficient energy to escape.  The solution to this problem is a series of sinusoidal waves of fractional integral wavelengths determined by the width of the well.

Mechanics